The 1987 Brisbane Rugby League premiership was the 77th season of Brisbane's semi-professional rugby league football competition. Nine teams from across Brisbane competed for the premiership, which culminated in a grand final match between the Redcliffe and Past Brothers clubs.

Season summary 
Teams played each other three times, with 24 rounds of competition played. It resulted in a top four of Past Brothers, Northern Suburbs,  Redcliffe and Wynnum-Manly. The 1987 season is significant as most Rugby League historians view it as the final season of the BRL as a true top tier competition, as the entry of the Brisbane Broncos and  Gold Coast Giants into the NSWRL Premiership in 1988 devastated the BRL by stripping it of mainstream media coverage and players. This led to lower attendance and television viewership, with the competition essentially becoming a second tier league, before it eventually merged with its companion statewide competition, the Winfield State League, to form the Queensland Cup in 1996 (A Brisbane finals series was still run for two more seasons, but the season was merged into the new competition). However, there is debate that the competition, although vastly inferior to the NSWRL from 1988-1994, maintained first-grade status until 1995, when the ARL Premiership was introduced.

Teams

Finals

Grand Final 

Brothers 26 (Try: T. Bailey, J. Kilroy, M. Coyne, T. Rea, C. Mohr. Goal: T. Rea. )

Redcliffe 8 (Tries: T. Sandy. Goals: R. Keogh 2.)

Winfield State League 

The 1987 Winfield State League was the inaugural season of the Queensland Rugby League's statewide competition. A total of 14 teams competed in the season, 8 of which were BRL Premiership clubs. The remaining six were regional teams from across the state, hence the State League name. Wynnum Manly, Redcliffe, Brisbane Brothers and Toowoomba were the semi finalists.

References

Rugby league in Brisbane
Brisbane Rugby League season